New Energy for America was a plan led by Barack Obama and Joe Biden beginning in 2008 to invest in renewable energy sources, reduce reliance on foreign oil, address global warming issues, and create jobs for Americans. The main objective for the New Energy for America plan was to implement clean energy sources in the United States in order to switch from nonrenewable resources to renewable resources. The plan led by the Obama Administration aimed to implement short-term solutions to provide immediate relief from pain at the pump, and mid- to- long term solutions to provide a New Energy for America plan. The goals of the clean energy plan hoped to: invest in renewable technologies that will boost domestic manufacturing and increase homegrown energy, invest in training for workers of the clean technologies, strengthen the middle class, and help the economy.

History
The term "New Energy for America" was first used on July 28, 2004 at an event in downtown Boston that gathered leaders from labor, government, business, and the environmental community to discuss how the "new energy" economy is critical for the future. This event raised awareness for the need for renewable energy and suggested that the new energy economy is about jobs, national security, public health, and the planet left behind for future generations.

The plan was presented in the Barack Obama presidential campaign, 2008.

President Barack Obama in his inaugural address called for the expanded use of renewable energy to meet the twin challenges of energy security and climate change.

In 2009, the Obama Administration made an effort to allow homeowners to finance solar and energy improvements without cost upfront, also known as PACE (Property-Assessed Clean Energy); They collaborated with the Middle Class Task Force to create a Policy Framework for PACE Financing Programs.

Obama issued a pair of memoranda on January 26 2009 to publish higher fuel economy standards for the model year 2011 cars and light trucks by the end of March and lower greenhouse gas emissions (to revisit a California waiver request that would allow that state to implement its own greenhouse gas emission rules for vehicles).

In June 2014, the Clean Power Plan was proposed by the Environmental Protection Agency (EPA) to the Obama Administration. The plan hoped to fight global warming and was approved by President Obama on August 3, 2015.

On July 19, 2016, the Obama Administration announced a partnership between the Clean Energy Savings For All Initiative and the Departments of Energy (DOE), Housing and Urban Development (HUD), Agriculture (USDA), Health and Human Services (HHS), Veteran's Affairs (V.A.), and the Environmental Protection Agency (EPA). This plan hoped to increase access to solar energy and promote energy efficiency in low-to-moderate income communities.

Content
The plan aimed to:
Help create five million new jobs by investing $150 billion over the next ten years to encourage private efforts to develop clean energy sources and technology.
Save more oil than the United States currently imports from the Middle East and Venezuela combined within 10 years.
Put 1 million Plug-In Hybrid cars on the road by 2015, with emphasis on cars built in the United States.
Generate 10 percent of the United States' electricity through renewable sources (renewable electricity) by 2012, and 25 percent by 2025.
Implement a cap-and-trade program to help reduce greenhouse gas emissions 80 percent by 2050.

Short-Term Solutions

The New Energy for America plan offered three short-term solutions. These solutions were meant to financially help Americans during a time when energy prices were high. The first solution would be to provide emergency energy rebate. This would be achieved by requiring oil companies to take a share of their profit and provide relief worth $500 per individual and $1000 per couple to help families cope with the rising prices of gas and electricity. The second solution would be to enact a legislation that would prevent oil companies from unfairly raising their prices. The third solution would be to release oil from the Strategic Petroleum Reserve. Obama and Biden supported releasing oil from the reserve and replacing it with an oil that would benefit the long-term while lowering oil prices for American.  

Mid- to long-term solutions

The New Energy for America plan offered six mid- to long-term solutions. These solutions were meant to help resolve the issue of global climate change and help America become less dependent on foreign oil. The first solution would deal with climate change by implementing a Cap and Trade Program to reduce greenhouse gas emissions and developing a global program with the United Nations Framework Convention on Climate Change (UNFCCC). The second solution would be investing in a secure energy future (1) by investing $150 billion over ten years to develop 5 million new green jobs. (2) by creating a new “Green Vet Initiative” that would help veterans enter the new energy economy. (3) by converting manufacturing companies into centers that help Americans learn skills in producing new energy products. (4) by directing funds to federal workplace training programs that would have green technology, advanced manufacturing, and weatherization training. The third solution would be to make cars, trucks, and SUVs fuel efficient by increasing fuel economy standards by 4% every year as well as develop advanced fuel-efficient vehicles by giving domestic automakers $4 billion retooling tax credits and loan guarantee. Congress and auto companies would work to ensure that all new vehicles have FFV capability while a clean alternative fuel and establish a national Low Carbon Fuel Standard (LCFS) that would introduce low-carbon non-petroleum fuels was developed. The fourth solution would be to promote the supply of domestic energy by making oil companies drill in open areas on land they already have access to or make them sell to another company that will. America would also prioritize the construction of the Alaska Gas Pipeline and getting more oil from existing oil fields within the US. The fifth solution would be to diversify America's energy sources by (1) requiring 10% of electricity consumed in the US come from clean energy sources by 2012. (2) developing clean coal technology as well as commercialize it. (3) securing nuclear energy and making sure waste from reactor sites is contained. The final solution would be to reduce energy and lower costs by (1) implementing a program that would work to reduce electricity usage. (2) providing more resources to the Department of Energy so they stop missing deadlines that have cost Americans millions of dollars. (3) reducing Federal energy consumption and require states to conduct proceedings that implement incentive changes and offer assistance to utility companies. (5) investing in using a Smart Grid to better transmit and monitor energy, and fund LIHEAP so that it will give heating assistance to low income families during the winter. (6) investing in repairing roads and bridges while encouraging public transportation.

Implementation 
Though the New Energy for America plan was never fully implemented as originally announced, many parts of the plan were implemented through various later-developed acts, plans, and executive orders throughout Barack Obama’s time as president.

The American Recovery and Reinvestment Act of 2009

The first pieces of the New Energy for America plan put into action were done so through The American Recovery and Reinvestment Act of 2009 that was introduced in the wake of the Great Recession of 2008. In 2009, President Barack Obama signed the Recovery Act into law to combat the effects of the Great Recession. The American Recovery and Reinvestment Act implemented major points and policies of the previously announced New Energy for America. This included $90 Billion towards government investments and tax incentives that promoted job creation and laid a solid foundation for clean energy. An additional $150 billion was leveraged in private and other non-federal capital for clean energy investments resulting in more significant usage of Solar and Wind Energy.

Although these plans have different names, parts of the Recovery act sought to achieve the same goals as the New Energy for America plan. The U.S. Department of Energy invested the funds from the Recovery Act into six main categories, which included:

Increasing energy efficiency

 Weatherizing and increasing energy usage efficiency in over 650,000 low-income family homes across the U.S.

Upgrading the transportation system 

 Invested money into American companies to stimulate the growth of the electric car industry. Also increased the number of electric vehicle charging stations in the U.S from fewer than 500 to over 18,000 by 2012.

Renewable Energy

 Funded over 20,000 projects through tax cuts or cash assistance for clean energy manufacturing and production which led to a doubling of U.S renewable energy by 2012.

Smart grid infrastructure

 Investments to modernize our grid and build a safe and secure nationwide electrical system that allows access to renewable energy sources and uses smart meters for consumers to better manage their energy use.

Deeper innovative research

 Devoted to funding high-risk, high reward key research through the ARPA-E program.

Cleaning up U.S. nuclear waste

 The Office of Environmental Management used these funds to decrease the United States’ nuclear carbon footprint by 69% throughout the Recovery act.

In September of 2009, Barack Obama allowed the EPA (Environmental Protection Agency) to move forward with rules that heavily regulate greenhouse gas emissions from hundreds of power plants and large industrial facilities.

Presidential Climate Action Plan

President Barack Obama adopted further climate goals from the original New Energy for America plan into the 
Presidential Climate Action Plan. The Climate Action Plan, last announced in June, 2013, included regulations with the goal of cutting domestic carbon emissions, to prepare the U.S. for impending effects of climate change, and to work internationally to address climate change. In 2017, President Donald Trump repealed Obama’s Climate Action Plan on his first day of office, viewing the plan as harmful to the economy.

Recorded Impact

On June 29, 2017, Americanprogress.org released a study on the changes in U.S. energy usage climate impact between 2008 and 2016. The study found:

 Energy reliance on coal went down over 18%, changing the dominant source of U.S. electric supply from coal to natural gas.
 Between 2008 and 2016, led by solar and wind power, renewable energy grew significantly.
 There was significant job creation from improvements in energy efficiency and clean energy production.

See also
American Recovery and Reinvestment Plan
Clean Air Act
Corporate Average Fuel Economy (CAFE)
Energy Independence and Security Act of 2007
Energy Policy of the Obama Administration
United States energy independence

References

Presidency of Barack Obama
Energy policy of the United States
Climate change policy in the United States
Renewable energy in the United States